The Earth–ionosphere waveguide refers to the phenomenon in which certain radio waves can propagate in the space between the ground and the boundary of the ionosphere.
Because the ionosphere contains charged particles, it can behave as a conductor.  The earth operates as a ground plane, and the resulting cavity behaves as a large waveguide.

Extremely low frequency (ELF) (< 3 kHz) and very low frequency (VLF) 
(3–30 kHz) signals can propagate efficiently in this waveguide.  For instance, lightning strikes launch a signal called radio atmospherics, which can travel many thousands of kilometers, because they are confined between the Earth and the ionosphere.
The round-the-world nature of the waveguide produces resonances, like a cavity, which are at ~7 Hz.

Introduction 

Radio propagation within the ionosphere  depends on frequency, angle of incidence, time of day, season, Earth's magnetic field, and solar activity. At  vertical incidence, waves with frequencies larger than the  electron plasma frequency ( in Hz)
of the F-layer maximum

For oblique incidence, the critical frequency becomes larger.

Very low frequencies (VLF: 3–30 kHz), and extremely low frequencies (ELF: <3  kHz) are reflected at the ionospheric D- and lower E-layer. An exception is whistler propagation of lightning signals along the geomagnetic field 
lines.

The wavelengths of  VLF waves (10–100 km) are already comparable with the height of the ionospheric D-layer (about 70 km during the day, and 90  km during the night). Therefore, ray theory is only  applicable for propagation over short distances, while mode theory must be used for larger distances. The region between Earth's surface and the ionospheric D-layer behaves thus like a waveguide for VLF- and ELF-waves.

In the presence of the ionospheric plasma and the geomagnetic field, electromagnetic waves exist for frequencies which are larger than the gyrofrequency of the ions (about 1 Hz).  Waves with frequencies smaller than the gyrofrequency are called hydromagnetic waves. The geomagnetic pulsations with periods of seconds to minutes as well as Alfvén waves belong to that type of waves.

Transfer function 
The prototype of a short vertical rod  antenna is a vertical electric Hertz dipole in which electric alternating currents of frequency f flow. Its radiation of electromagnetic waves within the Earth-ionospheric waveguide can be described by a transfer function T(ρ,ω):

where Ez is the vertical component of the electric field  at the receiver in a distance ρ from the transmitter, Eo is the electric field of a Hertzian dipole in free space, and  the angular frequency. Evidently, the Earth–ionosphere waveguide is dispersive because the transfer function depends on frequency. This means that phase- and group velocity of the waves are frequency dependent.

Ray theory 
In the VLF range, the transfer function  is the sum of a ground wave which arrives directly at the receiver and multihop sky waves reflected at the ionospheric D-layer (Figure 1).

For the real Earth's surface, the  ground wave becomes dissipated and depends on the orography along the ray path.

At shorter distances, only the first hop sky wave is of importance. The D-layer can be simulated by a magnetic wall with a fixed boundary at a virtual  height h, which means a phase jump of 180° at the reflection point. In reality, the electron density of the D-layer increases with altitude, and the wave is bounded as shown in Figure 2.

The sum of ground wave and first hop wave displays an interference pattern with interference minima if the difference between the ray paths of ground and first sky wave is half a wavelength (or a phase difference of 180°). The last interference minimum on the ground (z = 0) between the ground wave and the first sky wave is at a horizontal  distance of

with c the velocity of light. In the example of Figure 3, this is at about  500 km distance.

Wave mode theory 
The theory of ray propagation of VLF waves breaks down at larger distances because in the sum of these waves successive multihop sky waves are involved, and the sum diverges. In addition, it becomes necessary to take into account the spherical Earth.  Mode theory 
which is the sum of eigen-modes in the Earth–ionosphere waveguide is valid in this range of distances. The wave modes have fixed vertical structures of their vertical electric field components with maximum amplitudes at the bottom and zero amplitudes at the top of the waveguide. 
In the case of the fundamental first mode, it is a quarter wavelength.  With decreasing frequency, the eigenvalue becomes imaginary at the cutoff frequency, where the mode changes to an evanescent wave. For the first mode, this happens at

below which that mode will not propagate (Figure 4).

The attenuation of the modes increases with wavenumber n. Therefore, essentially only the first two modes are involved in  the wave propagation The first interference minimum between these two modes is at the same distance as that of the last interference minimum of ray  theory indicating the equivalence of both theories
As seen in Figure 3, the spacing between the mode interference minima is constant and about 1000 km in this example. The first mode becomes dominant at distances greater than about 1500 km, because the second mode is more strongly attenuated than the first mode.

In the range of ELF waves, only mode theory is appropriate. The fundamental mode is the zeroth mode (Figure 4). The D-layer becomes here an electric wall (Ri = 1). Its vertical structure is simply a vertical electric field constant with altitude.

In particular, a resonance zeroth mode  exists for waves which are an integral part of the Earth's circumference and has the frequency

with the Earth's radius. The first resonance peaks are at 7.5, 15,  and 22,5 Hz. These are the Schumann resonances. The spectral signals from lightning are amplified at those frequencies.

Waveguide characteristics 
The above discussion merely illustrates a simple picture of mode and ray theory. More detailed treatments require a large computer program. In particular, it is difficult to 
solve the problem of the horizontal and vertical inhomogeneities of the waveguide. The effect of the Earth's curvature is, that near the antipode the field strength slightly increases. Due to the influence of the Earth' magnetic field, the medium becomes anisotropic so that the ionospheric reflection factor in reality is a matrix. This means that a vertically polarized incident wave after reflection at the ionospheric D-layer converses to a vertically and a horizontally polarized wave. Moreover, the geomagnetic field gives rise to a nonreciprocity of VLF waves. Waves propagating from east to west are more strongly attenuated than vice versa. During the times of sunrise and/or sunset, there is sometimes a phase gain or loss of 360° because of the irreversible behavior of the first sky wave.

The dispersion characteristics of the Earth-ionospheric waveguide can be used for locating thunderstorm activity by measurements of the difference of the group time delay of lightning signals (sferics) at adjacent frequencies up to distances of 10000 km. The Schumann resonances allow to determine the global lightning activity.

See also 

Alfvén resonator
Atmospheric duct
Shortwave radio
Skywave
Tropospheric ducting

References and notes 
Notes

Citations

Electromagnetism
Ionosphere
Radio frequency propagation